is a manga trilogy by Osamu Tezuka. It was serialized in Big Comic, a manga magazine published by Shogakukan. It is licensed in North America by Vertical. It is also licensed in France by Delcourt/Akata, in Italy by Hazard Edizioni, and in Brazil by Veneta.

The story is about a post-World War II Japanese landlord family, the Tenge (天外), who have to cope with economic and family tensions while the country is under reconstruction.

Plot
This problem is aggravated by her discovery of terrible incestuous affairs in her own family: the wife of her older brother (foster son of Sakuemon Tenge) is actually her mother, who has to frequently have sex with Ayako's father, the family patriarch Sakuemon. To hide these secrets, the family—under pressure from Sakuemon and his eldest son Ichiro—decides to keep Ayako locked up in the basement for the rest of her life.

Despite the efforts of her mother and younger brother Shiro, she lives for nearly two dozen years under the family's house, while great political and social changes occur above her. Ayako eventually leaves the basement after growing into a beautiful and attractive woman, and seeks affection from others while remaining terrified of the outside world. This sets off a chain reaction of events which spells tragedy for the Tenge family.

See also
Osamu Tezuka
List of Osamu Tezuka manga
Osamu Tezuka's Star System
National Railway Workers' Union
Shimoyama incident

References

Further reading

External links
 
 Ayako at TezukaOsamu.Net 
 Ayako at TezukaOsamu@World
 Akata (publisher's) site 

1972 manga
Osamu Tezuka manga
Shogakukan manga
Vertical (publisher) titles
Seinen manga
Incest in anime and manga
Gekiga
Gekiga by Osamu Tezuka